Vosbury is a surname. Notable people with the surname include: 

C. Edward Vosbury, American architect
Cole Vosbury (born 1991), American singer, songwriter, producer, and musician

See also
 Vosburg, town in South Africa